Bright Island is a children's novel by Mabel Robinson. It tells the story of Thankful Curtis, who, having grown up on a small island off the coast of Maine, reluctantly agrees to attend school on the mainland for her senior year.
The novel, illustrated by Lynd Ward, was first published in 1937 and was a Newbery Honor recipient in 1938.

References

1937 American novels
American children's novels
Newbery Honor-winning works
Novels set in Maine
1937 children's books